The ninth and final season of the American legal drama Suits was ordered on January 23, 2019. With its renewal, it was announced that it would be the final season of the show with all regulars from the previous season returning. Unlike the second through eighth season, the ninth season consisted of ten episodes instead of sixteen. The final season premiered on USA Network in the United States July 17, 2019, followed by the premiere of spin-off series Pearson.

Cast

Regular cast
 Gabriel Macht as Harvey Specter
 Rick Hoffman as Louis Litt
 Sarah Rafferty as Donna Paulsen
 Amanda Schull as Katrina Bennett
 Dulé Hill as Alex Williams
 Katherine Heigl as Samantha Wheeler
 Patrick J. Adams as Mike Ross

Recurring cast
 Denise Crosby as Faye Richardson
 Aloma Wright as Gretchen Bodinski
 Rachael Harris as Sheila Sazs
 Alison Louder as Susan
 Brynn Thayer as Lily Specter

Guest cast
 Sasha Roiz as Thomas Kessler
 Jeffrey Nordling as Eric Kaldor
 Stephen Macht as Henry Gerard
 David Reale as Benjamin
 Ray Proscia as Dr. Stan Lipschitz
 Brian Hallisay as Craig Cameron
 Derek McGrath as Mr. Paulsen
 Daniel Bellomy as Jeremy Wall
 Wendell Pierce as Robert Zane
 Benjamin Ayres as Gavin Andrews
 Jake Epstein as Brian Altman
 Kurtwood Smith as Reed Tucker
 Max Topplin as Harold Gunderson
 Amy Acker as Esther Edelstein
 Usman Ally as Andrew Malik
 Neal McDonough as Sean Cahill 
 Eric Roberts as Charles Forstman
 Erik Palladino as Kevin Miller

Episodes

Production

Final season decision
With the renewal, creator Aaron Korsh offered insight on the decision to end the show with a 10-episode ninth season. He stated that he and USA Network decided to extend the cast contracts for two more years beyond season 7 after they wrapped production on season 6. Speaking on the shortened final season, he shared: "Our winter runs consist of 6 episodes, so we all felt like it would be very difficult to just have a truncated finale to a season. We always wanted to have the big 10 in the summer, to go out on a high note so to speak."

In addition to the ten first-run episodes, USA aired a repeat of the series pilot episode on August 28, with additional commentary from the cast members added.

Casting
Korsh revealed intentions to bring back characters from the past as it has "always been in the lexicon of Suits to bring people back and that's because I think that's how life works," but that the writers were deciding on whom exactly they wanted to bring back as too much returning characters would prevent the story from moving forward. He denied rumors started by British tabloids that they were trying to get Meghan Markle back for a cameo in exchange for a large donation to charity, although he did share that he and Patrick J. Adams were contemplating bringing Mike Ross back for the final season if it worked out with Adams' schedule. At the same time, he stated a cross-over with characters from Pearson had not been ruled out nor planned. On June 3, 2019, it was officially announced that Adams would return as a guest star for the fifth episode of the season. Korsh also hinted that he could re-appear in the series finale, though that was still uncertain. Additionally, Korsh stated that they would always welcome Markle back if she were to reach out, but he did not see it happening.

Following the eighth-season finale, Korsh stated in an interview that Wendell Pierce's Robert Zane was written out of the show given Pierce's uncertain availability for the ninth season. Nevertheless, Korsh hoped that they would be able to bring him back.

Writing
Additionally, Korsh shared that the ninth season would pick up shortly after where the eighth season left off. After the eighth-season finale, Korsh further shared that the ninth season would explore the newfound relationship between Donna and Harvey and teased that there could be marriage and death in the final season. On Patrick J. Adams' return, Korsh elaborated that Mike's return would see him embroiled in a case against Harvey and Samantha.

Filming
The table read for the fifth episode featuring Mike Ross' return was scheduled for mid-June with filming starting shortly after. Initially, Patrick J. Adams was going to direct the series' penultimate episode, thus the ninth of the season, but his signing on to star in The Right Stuff prevented that plan from coming to fruition.

Ratings

References

External links 
 
 

2019 American television seasons
Suits (American TV series)